Jorge (Jordi) Maiz Chacon (born 26 September 1977) is a Spaninsh medieval historian, specializing in historiography, economic history, and social minorities.

Since 2002, Chacón works as a professor at the UNED in the Balearic Islands, as well as a secondary school teacher in Mallorca. He is a member of the Center for Medieval Studies at the University of Murcia and an editor of Medievalismo, a Spanish website dedicated to medieval history.

Works
His works include:

Books - History

Viure al marge. La vida quotidiana dels jueus de Mallorca (segles XIII-XIV), Lleonard Muntaner Editor, Palma, 2013. 
Breve historia de los reinos ibéricos, Ariel, Barcelona, 2013. 
Los judíos de Baleares en la Baja Edad Media. Economía y política, UNED - Netbiblo, La Coruña, 2010. 
Actas del IV Simposio Internacional de Jóvenes Medievalistas, Ayutamiento de Lorca - Universidad de Murcia, Murcia, 2009. , 287 págs
	
Books - Poetry
	

Los suculentos quejidos de la turba, Baile del Sol, Tegueste - Tenerife, 2013.
Los infractores con la careta de la revancha, Germania, Alzira, 2013. 
 'Piedra, papel, cizallas' en: Campamento Dignidad. Poemas para la conciencia,  Baladre y Zambra, Málaga, 2013.
Muchedumbres, Calumnia Ediciones, Palma, 2011.
 'El Estado y el Camaleón' en: 65 Salvocheas, Quorum, Cádiz, 2011.
La cárcava de los iracundos, Insomnus, Palma, 2010. Poemario ilustrado

References

External links
Jorge Maíz Chacón in Dialnet.

1977 births
Spanish medievalists
21st-century Spanish historians
Living people